Strawberry Runners is an American rock band, and the primary music project of songwriter and artist, Emi Night.

History 
The band started in Denver, Colorado and is now based primarily in Brooklyn. The narrative songwriting of Night's early songs tell the story of her experience growing up in the Ohio River Valley. Originally named "Summer Salt", the band made their debut at Plan-It-X Fest (music festival put on by Plan-It-X Records) in Bloomington, Indiana in the summer of 2011. Night played a handful of solo concerts under this name throughout 2011 and 2012, before reforming the band and officially changing their name in 2013.

Strawberry Runners was named "One of Ten Bands About to Blow Up" by Wired in 2015, after making NPR's Austin 100 list ahead of the 2015 SXSW music festival.

Discography 
Happy Birthday (Demos 2017-2020) (2021) - Self-Released EP
In The Garden, In The Night (2017) - Salinas Records EP
Hatcher Creek Tape (2015) - Self-released, two-sided single
The Places You Call Home (as Summer Salt) - Wild Baby Records, Discount Horse Records LP

References 

Musical groups established in 2014
Musical groups from Denver
Indie pop groups from Colorado
2014 establishments in Colorado